Clarke Bluff is a steep bluff,  high, at the east end of Feeney Ridge in the Wilson Hills in Antarctica. It was mapped by the United States Geological Survey from surveys and U.S. Navy air photos, 1960–63, and named by the Advisory Committee on Antarctic Names for Lieutenant Jon B. Clarke, U.S. Navy, navigator on aerial photographic missions in LC-130F Hercules aircraft during Operation Deep Freeze 1967 and 1968.

References
 

Cliffs of Oates Land